The 1980 Suisse Open Gstaad was a men's tennis tournament played on outdoor clay courts in Gstaad, Switzerland. It was the 35th edition of the tournament and was held from 7 July through 13 July 1980. The tournament was part of the 1980 Volvo Grand Prix tennis circuit. Third-seeded Heinz Günthardt won the singles title.

Finals

Singles
 Heinz Günthardt defeated  Kim Warwick 4–6, 6–4, 7–6
 It was Günthardt's 3rd singles title of the year and the 4th of his career.

Doubles
 Colin Dowdeswell /  Ismail El Shafei defeated  Mark Edmondson /  Kim Warwick 6–4, 6–4

References

External links
  Official website
 ATP tournament profile
 ITF tournament edition details

Swiss Open (tennis)
Swiss Open Gstaad
1980 Grand Prix (tennis)